Acrocercops xystrota is a moth of the family Gracillariidae. It is known from Guyana.

References

xystrota
Moths described in 1915
Gracillariidae of South America